The Túy Loan River is a river of Da Nang, Vietnam. It flows for 30 kilometres.

References

Rivers of Da Nang
Rivers of Vietnam